Shermaine Dacildes Efraim Martina (born 14 April 1996) is a Curaçaoan professional footballer who currently plays as a midfielder for the Curaçao national team.

Club career
He made his professional debut in the Eerste Divisie for MVV on 7 August 2015 in a game against Helmond Sport. His contract with MVV expired in July 2020.

In March 2021, Martina joined North Carolina in USL League One.

International career
Shermar made his international debut for the Curaçao national football team in a 1–1 friendly tie with Bolivia on 23 March 2018.

Personal
He is a twin brother of Shermar Martina, who plays for MVV Maastricht.

Honours

International
Curaçao
 King's Cup: 2019

References

External links
 
 Soccerway Profile

1996 births
Footballers from Tilburg
Curaçao footballers
Curaçao international footballers
Dutch people of Curaçao descent
Twin sportspeople
Dutch twins
Living people
Dutch footballers
MVV Maastricht players
Eerste Divisie players
Association football defenders
2019 CONCACAF Gold Cup players
North Carolina FC players
USL League One players